Rockland Historic District is a national historic district located at Rockland, New Castle County, Delaware.  It encompasses 6 contributing buildings  in the hamlet of Rockland and associated with Rockland Mills.  They include the school (1831), Mansion House (1802), Heshbon Factory mill building, the Kirk House (1797, 1885), and Rock Spring and the springhouse.

It was added to the National Register of Historic Places in 1972.

References

Historic districts on the National Register of Historic Places in Delaware
Historic districts in New Castle County, Delaware
National Register of Historic Places in New Castle County, Delaware